New Hampshire was admitted to the Union on June 21, 1788. It elects United States senators to Class 2 and Class 3. The state's current senators are Democrats Jeanne Shaheen and Maggie Hassan. Senator Shaheen is currently serving her third term (since 2009); Senator Hassan is currently serving her second term (since 2017). Jacob Harold Gallinger was New Hampshire's longest-serving senator (1891–1918).

List of senators

|- style="height:2em"
! rowspan=2 | 1
| rowspan=2 align=left | Paine Wingate
| rowspan=2  | Anti-Admin.
| rowspan=2 nowrap | Mar 4, 1789 –Mar 3, 1793
| rowspan=2 | Josiah Bartlett was at first elected in 1788, but "declined the appointment." Elected in 1789.Lost re-election.
| rowspan=2 | 1
| 
| rowspan=3 | 1
| rowspan=3 | Elected in 1788.
| rowspan=6 nowrap | Mar 4, 1789 –Mar 3, 1801
| rowspan=2  | Pro-Admin.
| rowspan=6 align=right | John Langdon
! rowspan=6 | 1

|- style="height:2em"
| 

|- style="height:2em"
! rowspan=5 | 2
| rowspan=5 align=left | Samuel Livermore
|  | Pro-Admin.
| rowspan=5 nowrap | Mar 4, 1793 –Jun 12, 1801
| rowspan=3 | Elected in 1792.
| rowspan=3 | 2
| 
|  | Anti-Admin.

|- style="height:2em"
| rowspan=4  | Federalist
| 
| rowspan=3 | 2
| rowspan=3 | Re-election year unknown.
| rowspan=3  | Democratic-Republican

|- style="height:2em"
| 

|- style="height:2em"
| rowspan=2 | Re-elected in 1798.Resigned.
| rowspan=7 | 3
| 

|- style="height:2em"
| rowspan=5 
| rowspan=7 | 3
| rowspan=3 | Elected in 1800.Resigned.
| rowspan=3 nowrap | Mar 4, 1801 –Jun 14, 1802
| rowspan=3  | Federalist
| rowspan=3 align=right | James Sheafe
! rowspan=3 | 2

|- style="height:2em"
| colspan=3 | Vacant
| nowrap | Jun 12, 1801 –Jun 17, 1801
|  

|- style="height:2em"
! rowspan=4 | 3
| rowspan=4 align=left | Simeon Olcott
| rowspan=4  | Federalist
| rowspan=4 nowrap | Jun 17, 1801 –Mar 3, 1805
| rowspan=4 | Elected in 1801 to finish Livermore's term.

|- style="height:2em"
|  
| nowrap | Jun 14, 1802 –Jun 17, 1802
| colspan=3 | Vacant

|- style="height:2em"
| rowspan=3 | Elected in 1802 to finish Sheafe's term.Retired.
| rowspan=3 nowrap | Jun 17, 1802 –Mar 3, 1807
| rowspan=3  | Federalist
| rowspan=3 align=right | William Plumer
! rowspan=3 | 3

|- style="height:2em"
| 

|- style="height:2em"
! rowspan=9 | 4
| rowspan=9 align=left | Nicholas Gilman
| rowspan=9  | Democratic-Republican
| rowspan=9 nowrap | Mar 4, 1805 –May 2, 1814
| rowspan=5 | Elected in 1804.
| rowspan=5 | 4
| 

|- style="height:2em"
| 
| rowspan=5 | 4
| rowspan=2 | Elected in 1807.Resigned.
| rowspan=2 nowrap | Mar 4, 1807 –Jun 1, 1810
| rowspan=2  | Democratic-Republican
| rowspan=2 align=right nowrap | Nahum Parker
! rowspan=2 | 4

|- style="height:2em"
| rowspan=3 

|- style="height:2em"
|  
| nowrap | Jun 1, 1810 –Jun 21, 1810
| colspan=3 | Vacant

|- style="height:2em"
| rowspan=2 | Elected in 1810 to finish Parker's term.
| rowspan=2 nowrap | Jun 21, 1810 –Mar 3, 1813
| rowspan=2  | Federalist
| rowspan=2 align=right nowrap | Charles Cutts
! rowspan=4 | 5

|- style="height:2em"
| rowspan=4 | Re-elected in 1810.Died.
| rowspan=7 | 5
| 

|- style="height:2em"
| rowspan=5 
| rowspan=9 | 5
| Legislature failed to elect.
| nowrap | Mar 4, 1813 –Apr 2, 1813
| colspan=2 | Vacant

|- style="height:2em"
| Appointed to continue the term.Retired when successor elected.
| nowrap | Apr 2, 1813 –Jun 10, 1813
|  | Federalist
| align=right nowrap | Charles Cutts

|- style="height:2em"
| rowspan=5 | Elected in 1813 to finish Cutts's term.Resigned.
| rowspan=5 nowrap | Jun 10, 1813 –Jun 16, 1817
| rowspan=5  | Federalist
| rowspan=5 align=right | Jeremiah Mason
! rowspan=5 | 6

|- style="height:2em"
| colspan=3 | Vacant
| nowrap | May 2, 1814 –Jun 24, 1814
|  

|- style="height:2em"
! rowspan=2 | 5
| rowspan=2 align=left | Thomas W. Thompson
| rowspan=2  | Federalist
| rowspan=2 nowrap | Jun 24, 1814 –Mar 3, 1817
| rowspan=2 | Elected in 1814 to finish Gilman's term.

|- style="height:2em"
| 

|- style="height:2em"
! rowspan=5 | 6
| rowspan=5 align=left | David L. Morril
| rowspan=5  | Democratic-Republican
| rowspan=5 nowrap | Mar 4, 1817 –Mar 3, 1823
| rowspan=5 | Elected in 1816.Retired.
| rowspan=5 | 6
| rowspan=3 

|- style="height:2em"
|  
| nowrap | Jun 16, 1817 –Jun 27, 1817
| colspan=3 | Vacant

|- style="height:2em"
| Elected in 1817 to finish Mason's term.
| nowrap | Jun 27, 1817 –Mar 3, 1819
|  | Democratic-Republican
| align=right | Clement Storer
! 7

|- style="height:2em"
| 
| rowspan=3 | 6
| rowspan=3 | Elected in 1818.
| rowspan=3 nowrap | Mar 4, 1819 –Mar 3, 1825
| rowspan=3  | Democratic-Republican
| rowspan=3 align=right | John Fabyan Parrott
! rowspan=3 | 8

|- style="height:2em"
| 

|- style="height:2em"
! rowspan=7 | 7
| rowspan=7 align=left | Samuel Bell
|  | Democratic-Republican
| rowspan=7 nowrap | Mar 4, 1823 –Mar 3, 1835
| rowspan=4 | Elected in 1823.
| rowspan=4 | 7
| 

|- style="height:2em"
| rowspan=6  | NationalRepublican
| rowspan=2 
| rowspan=4 | 7
|  
| nowrap | Mar 3, 1825 –Mar 16, 1825
| colspan=3 | Vacant

|- style="height:2em"
| rowspan=3 | Elected in 1825.
| rowspan=3 nowrap | Mar 16, 1825 –Mar 3, 1831
| rowspan=3  | Jacksonian
| rowspan=3 align=right | Levi Woodbury
! rowspan=3 | 9

|- style="height:2em"
| 

|- style="height:2em"
| rowspan=3 | Re-elected in 1828 or 1829.Retired.
| rowspan=3 | 8
| 

|- style="height:2em"
| 
| rowspan=5 | 8
| rowspan=3 | Elected in 1831.Resigned to become Governor of New Hampshire.
| rowspan=3 nowrap | Mar 4, 1831 –May 30, 1836
| rowspan=3  | Jacksonian
| rowspan=3 align=right | Isaac Hill
! rowspan=3 | 10

|- style="height:2em"
| 

|- style="height:2em"
! rowspan=5 | 8
| rowspan=5 align=left | Henry Hubbard
| rowspan=3  | Jacksonian
| rowspan=5 nowrap | Mar 4, 1835 –Mar 3, 1841
| rowspan=5 | Elected in 1835.Retired to run for Governor of New Hampshire.
| rowspan=5 | 9
| rowspan=3 

|- style="height:2em"
|  
| nowrap | May 30, 1836 –Jun 8, 1836
| colspan=3 | Vacant

|- style="height:2em"
| Elected in 1836 to finish Hill's term.Lost re-election.
| nowrap | Jun 8, 1836 –Mar 3, 1837
|  | Jacksonian
| align=right | John Page
! 11

|- style="height:2em"
| rowspan=2  | Democratic
| 
| rowspan=4 | 9
| rowspan=3 | Elected in 1837.Resigned.
| rowspan=3 nowrap | Mar 4, 1837 –Feb 28, 1842
| rowspan=3  | Democratic
| rowspan=3 align=right | Franklin Pierce
! rowspan=3 | 12

|- style="height:2em"
| 

|- style="height:2em"
! rowspan=4 | 9
| rowspan=4 align=left | Levi Woodbury
| rowspan=4  | Democratic
| rowspan=4 nowrap | Mar 4, 1841 –Sep 20, 1845
| rowspan=4 | Elected in 1841.Resigned to become a Justice of the U.S. Supreme Court.
| rowspan=7 | 10
| rowspan=2 

|- style="height:2em"
| Appointed to continue Pierce's term.Elected in 1842 to finish Pierce's term.
| nowrap | Mar 1, 1842 –Mar 3, 1843
|  | Democratic
| align=right | Leonard Wilcox
! 13

|- style="height:2em"
| 
| rowspan=6 | 10
| rowspan=6 | Elected in 1843.
| rowspan=6 nowrap | Mar 4, 1843 –Mar 3, 1849
| rowspan=6  | Democratic
| rowspan=6 align=right | Charles G. Atherton
! rowspan=6 | 14

|- style="height:2em"
| rowspan=4 

|- style="height:2em"
| colspan=3 | Vacant
| nowrap | Sep 20, 1845 –Dec 1, 1845
|  

|- style="height:2em"
! 10
| align=left | Benning W. Jenness
|  | Democratic
| nowrap | Dec 1, 1845 –Jun 13, 1846
| Appointed to continue Woodbury's term.Lost election to finish Woodbury's term.

|- style="height:2em"
! 11
| align=left | Joseph Cilley
|  | Liberty
| nowrap | Jun 13, 1846 –Mar 3, 1847
| Elected in 1846 to finish Woodbury's term.Lost election to next term.

|- style="height:2em"
! rowspan=3 | 12
| rowspan=3 align=left | John P. Hale
|  | IndependentDemocratic
| rowspan=3 nowrap | Mar 4, 1847 –Mar 3, 1853
| rowspan=3 | Elected in 1846.Retired to run for President of the United States.
| rowspan=3 | 11
| 

|- style="height:2em"
| rowspan=2  | Free Soil
| 
| rowspan=8 | 11
| rowspan=6 | Elected in 1848 or 1849.Died.
| rowspan=6 nowrap | Mar 4, 1849 –Jan 11, 1855
| rowspan=6  | Democratic
| rowspan=6 align=right | Moses Norris Jr.
! rowspan=6 | 15

|- style="height:2em"
| 

|- style="height:2em"
! 13
| align=left | Charles G. Atherton
|  | Democratic
| nowrap | Mar 4, 1853 –Nov 15, 1853
| Elected in 1852.Died.
| rowspan=11 | 12
| rowspan=6 

|- style="height:2em"
| colspan=3 | Vacant
| nowrap | Nov 15, 1853 –Nov 29, 1853
|  

|- style="height:2em"
! 14
| align=left | Jared W. Williams
|  | Democratic
| nowrap | Nov 29, 1853 –Jul 15, 1854
| Appointed to continue Atherton's term.Appointment expired without election.

|- style="height:2em"
| rowspan=4 colspan=3 | Vacant
| rowspan=4 nowrap | Jul 15, 1854 –Jul 30, 1855
| rowspan=4 |  

|- style="height:2em"
|  
| nowrap | Jan 11, 1855 –Jan 16, 1855
| colspan=3 | Vacant

|- style="height:2em"
| Appointed to finish Norris's term.
| nowrap | Jan 16, 1855 –Mar 3, 1855
|  | Democratic
| align=right | John S. Wells
! 16

|- style="height:2em"
| rowspan=2 
| rowspan=6 | 12
| Legislature failed to elect.
| nowrap | Mar 4, 1855 –Jul 29, 1855
| colspan=3 | Vacant

|- style="height:2em"
! rowspan=7 | 15
| rowspan=7 align=left | John P. Hale
| rowspan=7  | Republican
| rowspan=7 nowrap | Jul 30, 1855 –Mar 3, 1865
| rowspan=4 | Elected in 1855 to finish Atherton's term.
| rowspan=2 | Elected late in 1855.Died.
| rowspan=2 nowrap | Jul 30, 1855 –May 26, 1857
| rowspan=2  | Republican
| rowspan=2 align=right | James Bell
! rowspan=2 | 17

|- style="height:2em"
| rowspan=3 

|- style="height:2em"
|  
| nowrap | May 26, 1857 –Jun 27, 1857
| colspan=3 | Vacant

|- style="height:2em"
| rowspan=2 | Elected in 1857 to finish Bell's term.
| rowspan=5 nowrap | Jun 27, 1857 –Jul 27, 1866
| rowspan=5  | Republican
| rowspan=5 align=right | Daniel Clark
! rowspan=5 | 18

|- style="height:2em"
| rowspan=3 | Re-elected in 1859.
| rowspan=3 | 13
| 

|- style="height:2em"
| 
| rowspan=5 | 13
| rowspan=3 | Re-elected in 1861.Resigned.

|- style="height:2em"
| 

|- style="height:2em"
! rowspan=8 | 16
| rowspan=8 align=left | Aaron H. Cragin
| rowspan=8  | Republican
| rowspan=8 nowrap | Mar 4, 1865 –Mar 3, 1877
| rowspan=5 | Elected in 1864.
| rowspan=5 | 14
| rowspan=3 

|- style="height:2em"
|  
| nowrap | Jul 27, 1866 –Aug 31, 1866
| colspan=3 | Vacant

|- style="height:2em"
| Appointed to finish Clark's term.Retired.
| nowrap | Aug 31, 1866 –Mar 3, 1867
|  | Republican
| align=right | George G. Fogg
! 19

|- style="height:2em"
| 
| rowspan=3 | 14
| rowspan=3 | Elected in 1866 or 1867.Lost renomination.
| rowspan=3 nowrap | Mar 4, 1867 –Mar 3, 1873
| rowspan=3  | Republican
| rowspan=3 align=right | James W. Patterson
! rowspan=3 | 20

|- style="height:2em"
| 

|- style="height:2em"
| rowspan=3 | Re-elected in 1870.
| rowspan=3 | 15
| 

|- style="height:2em"
| 
| rowspan=3 | 15
| rowspan=3 | Elected in 1872.Lost re-election.
| rowspan=3 nowrap | Mar 4, 1873 –Mar 3, 1879
| rowspan=3  | Republican
| rowspan=3 align=right | Bainbridge Wadleigh
! rowspan=3 | 21

|- style="height:2em"
| 

|- style="height:2em"
! rowspan=6 | 17
| rowspan=6 align=left | Edward H. Rollins
| rowspan=6  | Republican
| rowspan=6 nowrap | Mar 4, 1877 –Mar 3, 1883
| rowspan=6 | Elected in 1876.Lost re-election.
| rowspan=6 | 16
| 

|- style="height:2em"
| rowspan=4 
| rowspan=7 | 16
| Legislature failed to elect.
| nowrap | Mar 3, 1879 –Mar 18, 1879
| colspan=3 | Vacant

|- style="height:2em"
| Appointed to fill vacancy caused by legislature's failure to elect.Retired.
| nowrap | Mar 18, 1879 –Jun 18, 1879
|  | Republican
| align=right | Charles H. Bell
! 22

|- style="height:2em"
|  
| nowrap | Jun 18, 1879 –Jun 20, 1879
| colspan=3 | Vacant

|- style="height:2em"
| rowspan=4 | Elected in 1879 to finish the vacant term.
| rowspan=4 nowrap | Jun 20, 1879 –Mar 3, 1885
| rowspan=4  | Republican
| rowspan=4 align=right | Henry W. Blair
! rowspan=12 | 23

|- style="height:2em"
| 

|- style="height:2em"
| colspan=3 | Vacant
| nowrap | Mar 4, 1883 –Aug 2, 1883
| Legislature failed to elect.
| rowspan=8 | 17
| 

|- style="height:2em"
! rowspan=3 | 18
| rowspan=3 align=left | Austin F. Pike
| rowspan=3  | Republican
| rowspan=3 nowrap | Aug 2, 1883 –Oct 8, 1886
| rowspan=3 | Elected late in 1883.Died.

|- style="height:2em"
| 
| rowspan=8 | 17
| Legislature failed to elect.
| nowrap | Mar 3, 1885 –Mar 5, 1885
| colspan=2 | Vacant

|- style="height:2em"
| rowspan=7 | Appointed to continue the vacant term.Elected in 1885 to finish the vacant term.Lost renomination.
| rowspan=7 nowrap | Mar 5, 1885 –Mar 3, 1891
| rowspan=7  | Republican
| rowspan=7 align=right | Henry W. Blair

|- style="height:2em"
| colspan=3 | Vacant
| nowrap | Oct 8, 1886 –Nov 14, 1886
|  

|- style="height:2em"
! rowspan=2 | 19
| rowspan=2 align=left | Person Colby Cheney
| rowspan=2  | Republican
| rowspan=2 nowrap | Nov 14, 1886 –Jun 14, 1887
| rowspan=2 | Appointed to continue Pike's term.Retired when successor qualified.

|- style="height:2em"
| rowspan=2 

|- style="height:2em"
! 20
| align=left | William E. Chandler
|  | Republican
| nowrap | Jun 14, 1887 –Mar 3, 1889
| Elected in 1887 to finish Pike's term.Legislature failed to elect.

|- style="height:2em"
! 21
| align=left | Gilman Marston
|  | Republican
| nowrap | Mar 4, 1889 –Jun 18, 1889
| Appointed to start term when legislature failed to elect.
| rowspan=4 | 18
| rowspan=2 

|- style="height:2em"
! rowspan=6 | 22
| rowspan=6 align=left | William E. Chandler
| rowspan=6  | Republican
| rowspan=6 nowrap | Jun 18, 1889 –Mar 3, 1901
| rowspan=3 | Elected in 1889 to finish the term.

|- style="height:2em"
| 
| rowspan=3 | 18
| rowspan=3 | Elected in 1891.
| rowspan=15 nowrap | Mar 4, 1891 –Aug 17, 1918
| rowspan=15  | Republican
| rowspan=15 align=right | Jacob Harold Gallinger
! rowspan=15 | 24

|- style="height:2em"
| 

|- style="height:2em"
| rowspan=3 | Re-elected in 1895.Lost renomination.
| rowspan=3 | 19
| 

|- style="height:2em"
| 
| rowspan=3 | 19
| rowspan=3 | Re-elected in 1897.

|- style="height:2em"
| 

|- style="height:2em"
! rowspan=6 | 23
| rowspan=6 align=left | Henry E. Burnham
| rowspan=6  | Republican
| rowspan=6 nowrap | Mar 4, 1901 –Mar 3, 1913
| rowspan=3 | Elected in 1901.
| rowspan=3 | 20
| 

|- style="height:2em"
| 
| rowspan=3 | 20
| rowspan=3 | Re-elected in 1903.

|- style="height:2em"
| 

|- style="height:2em"
| rowspan=3 | Re-elected in 1907.Retired.
| rowspan=3 | 21
| 

|- style="height:2em"
| 
| rowspan=4 | 21
| rowspan=4 | Re-elected in 1909.

|- style="height:2em"
| 

|- style="height:2em"
| colspan=3 | Vacant
| nowrap | Mar 4, 1913 – Mar 13, 1913
| Legislature elected late.
| rowspan=7 | 22
| rowspan=2 

|- style="height:2em"
! rowspan=6 | 24
| rowspan=6 align=left | Henry F. Hollis
| rowspan=6  | Democratic
| rowspan=6 nowrap | Mar 13, 1913 –Mar 3, 1919
| rowspan=6 | Elected late in 1913.Retired.

|- style="height:2em"
| 
| rowspan=6 | 22
| rowspan=2 | Re-elected in 1914.Died.

|- style="height:2em"
| rowspan=4 

|- style="height:2em"
|  
| nowrap | Aug 17, 1918 –Sep 2, 1918
| colspan=3 | Vacant

|- style="height:2em"
| Appointed to continue Gallinger's term.Retired.
| nowrap | Sep 2, 1918 –Nov 5, 1918
|  | Republican
| align=right | Irving W. Drew
! 25

|- style="height:2em"
| rowspan=2 | Elected in 1918 to finish Gallinger's term.
| rowspan=8 nowrap | Nov 6, 1918 –Mar 3, 1933
| rowspan=8  | Republican
| rowspan=8 align=right | George H. Moses
! rowspan=8 | 26

|- style="height:2em"
! rowspan=9 | 25
| rowspan=9 align=left | Henry W. Keyes
| rowspan=9  | Republican
| rowspan=9 nowrap | Mar 4, 1919 –Jan 3, 1937
| rowspan=3 | Elected in 1918.
| rowspan=3 | 23
| 

|- style="height:2em"
| 
| rowspan=3 | 23
| rowspan=3 | Re-elected in 1920.

|- style="height:2em"
| 

|- style="height:2em"
| rowspan=3 | Re-elected in 1924.
| rowspan=3 | 24
| 

|- style="height:2em"
| 
| rowspan=3 | 24
| rowspan=3 | Re-elected in 1926.Lost re-election.

|- style="height:2em"
| 

|- style="height:2em"
| rowspan=3 | Re-elected in 1930.Retired.
| rowspan=3 | 25
| 

|- style="height:2em"
| 
| rowspan=3 | 25
| rowspan=3 | Elected in 1932.Lost re-election.
| rowspan=3 nowrap | Mar 4, 1933 –Jan 3, 1939
| rowspan=3  | Democratic
| rowspan=3 align=right | Fred H. Brown
! rowspan=3 | 27

|- style="height:2em"
| 

|- style="height:2em"
! rowspan=16 | 26
| rowspan=16 align=left | Styles Bridges
| rowspan=16  | Republican
| rowspan=16 nowrap | Jan 3, 1937 –Nov 26, 1961
| rowspan=3 | Elected in 1936.
| rowspan=3 | 26
| 

|- style="height:2em"
| 
| rowspan=3 | 26
| rowspan=3 | Elected in 1938.
| rowspan=8 nowrap | Jan 3, 1939 –Jul 24, 1953
| rowspan=8  | Republican
| rowspan=8 align=right | Charles W. Tobey
! rowspan=8 | 28

|- style="height:2em"
| 

|- style="height:2em"
| rowspan=3 | Re-elected in 1942.
| rowspan=3 | 27
| 

|- style="height:2em"
| 
| rowspan=3 | 27
| rowspan=3 | Re-elected in 1944.

|- style="height:2em"
| 

|- style="height:2em"
| rowspan=6 | Re-elected in 1948.
| rowspan=6 | 28
| 

|- style="height:2em"
| 
| rowspan=6 | 28
| rowspan=2 | Re-elected in 1950.Died.

|- style="height:2em"
| rowspan=4 

|- style="height:2em"
|  
| nowrap | Jul 24, 1953 –Aug 14, 1953
| colspan=3 | Vacant

|- style="height:2em"
| Appointed to continue Tobey's term.Lost nomination to finish Tobey's term.
| nowrap | Aug 14, 1953 –Nov 7, 1954
|  | Republican
| align=right | Robert W. Upton
! 29

|- style="height:2em"
| rowspan=2 | Elected in 1954 to finish Tobey's term.
| rowspan=14 nowrap | Nov 8, 1954 –Dec 31, 1974
| rowspan=14  | Republican
| rowspan=14 align=right | Norris Cotton
! rowspan=14 | 30

|- style="height:2em"
| rowspan=3 | Re-elected in 1954.
| rowspan=3 | 29
| 

|- style="height:2em"
| 
| rowspan=6 | 29
| rowspan=6 | Re-elected in 1956.

|- style="height:2em"
| 

|- style="height:2em"
| Re-elected in 1960.Died.
| rowspan=6 | 30
| rowspan=4 

|- style="height:2em"
| colspan=3 | Vacant
| nowrap | Nov 26, 1961 –Jan 10, 1962
|  

|- style="height:2em"
! 27
| align=left | Moe Murphy
|  | Republican
| nowrap | Jan 10, 1962 –Nov 6, 1962
| Appointed to continue Bridges's term.Lost nomination to finish Bridges's term.

|- style="height:2em"
! rowspan=12 | 28
| rowspan=12 align=left | Thomas J. McIntyre
| rowspan=12  | Democratic
| rowspan=12 nowrap | Nov 7, 1962 –Jan 3, 1979
| rowspan=3 | Elected in 1962 to finish Bridge's term.

|- style="height:2em"
| 
| rowspan=3 | 30
| rowspan=3 | Re-elected in 1962.

|- style="height:2em"
| 

|- style="height:2em"
| rowspan=3 | Re-elected in 1966.
| rowspan=3 | 31
| 

|- style="height:2em"
| 
| rowspan=4 | 31
| rowspan=3 | Re-elected in 1968.Retired, then resigned early.

|- style="height:2em"
| 

|- style="height:2em"
| rowspan=6 | Re-elected in 1972.Lost re-election.
| rowspan=6 | 32
| rowspan=2 

|- style="height:2em"
| Appointed to finish Cotton's term.
| nowrap | Dec 31, 1974 –Jan 3, 1975
|  | Republican
| align=right | Louis Wyman
! 31

|- style="height:2em"
| rowspan=3 
| rowspan=6 | 32
| Contested election.
| nowrap | Jan 3, 1975 –Aug 8, 1975
| colspan=3 | Vacant

|- style="height:2em"
| Appointed to continue term after contested election.
| nowrap | Aug 8, 1975 –Sep 18, 1975
|  | Republican
| align=right | Norris Cotton
! 32

|- style="height:2em"
| rowspan=3 | Elected to finish contested term.Lost re-election and resigned early.
| rowspan=3 nowrap | Sep 18, 1975 –Dec 29, 1980
| rowspan=3  | Democratic
| rowspan=3 align=right | John A. Durkin
! rowspan=3 | 33

|- style="height:2em"
| 

|- style="height:2em"
! rowspan=7 | 29
| rowspan=7 align=left | Gordon J. Humphrey
| rowspan=7  | Republican
| rowspan=7 nowrap | Jan 3, 1979 –Dec 4, 1990
| rowspan=4 | Elected in 1978.
| rowspan=4 | 33
| rowspan=2 

|- style="height:2em"
| Appointed to finish Durkin's term, having been elected to the next term.
| rowspan=9 nowrap | Dec 29, 1980 –Jan 3, 1993
| rowspan=9  | Republican
| rowspan=9 align=right | Warren Rudman
! rowspan=9 | 34

|- style="height:2em"
| 
| rowspan=3 | 33
| rowspan=3 | Elected in 1980.

|- style="height:2em"
| 

|- style="height:2em"
| rowspan=3 | Re-elected in 1984.Retired and resigned early to take his seat in the New Hampshire Senate.
| rowspan=5 | 34
| 

|- style="height:2em"
| 
| rowspan=5 | 34
| rowspan=5 | Re-elected in 1986.Retired.

|- style="height:2em"
| rowspan=3 

|- style="height:2em"
| colspan=3 | Vacant
| nowrap | Dec 4, 1990 –Dec 7, 1990
|  

|- style="height:2em"
! rowspan=7 | 30
| rowspan=7 align=left | Bob Smith
| rowspan=7  | Republican
| rowspan=7 nowrap | Dec 7, 1990 –Jan 3, 2003
| Appointed to finish Humphrey's term, having already been elected to the next term.

|- style="height:2em"
| rowspan=3 | Elected in 1990.
| rowspan=3 | 35
| 

|- style="height:2em"
| 
| rowspan=3 | 35
| rowspan=3 | Elected in 1992.
| rowspan=9 nowrap | Jan 3, 1993 –Jan 3, 2011
| rowspan=9  | Republican
| rowspan=9 align=right | Judd Gregg
! rowspan=9 | 35

|- style="height:2em"
| 

|- style="height:2em"
| rowspan=3 | Re-elected in 1996.Lost renomination.
| rowspan=3 | 36
| 

|- style="height:2em"
| 
| rowspan=3 | 36
| rowspan=3 | Re-elected in 1998.

|- style="height:2em"
| 

|- style="height:2em"
! rowspan=3 | 31
| rowspan=3 align=left | John E. Sununu
| rowspan=3  | Republican
| rowspan=3 nowrap | Jan 3, 2003 –Jan 3, 2009
| rowspan=3 | Elected in 2002.Lost re-election.
| rowspan=3 | 37
| 

|- style="height:2em"
| 
| rowspan=3 | 37
| rowspan=3 | Re-elected in 2004.Retired.

|- style="height:2em"
| 

|- style="height:2em"
! rowspan=9 | 32
| rowspan=9 align=left | Jeanne Shaheen
| rowspan=9  | Democratic
| rowspan=9 nowrap | Jan 3, 2009 –Present
| rowspan=3 | Elected in 2008.
| rowspan=3 | 38
| 

|- style="height:2em"
| 
| rowspan=3 | 38
| rowspan=3 | Elected in 2010.Lost re-election.
| rowspan=3 | Jan 3, 2011 –Jan 3, 2017
| rowspan=3  | Republican
| rowspan=3 align=right | Kelly Ayotte
! rowspan=3 | 36

|- style="height:2em"
| 

|- style="height:2em"
| rowspan=3 | Re-elected in 2014.
| rowspan=3 | 39
| 

|- style="height:2em"
| 
| rowspan=3 | 39
| rowspan=3 | Elected in 2016.
| rowspan=6 nowrap | Jan 3, 2017 –Present
| rowspan=6  | Democratic
| rowspan=6 align=right | Maggie Hassan
! rowspan=6 | 37

|- style="height:2em"
| 

|- style="height:2em"
| rowspan=3  |Re-elected in 2020.
| rowspan=3 | 40
| 

|- style="height:2em"
| 
| rowspan=3|40
| rowspan=3| Re-elected in 2022.

|- style="height:2em"
| 

|- style="height:2em"
| rowspan=2 colspan=5 | To be determined in the 2026 election.
| rowspan=2| 41
| 

|- style="height:2em"
| 
| 41
| colspan=5 | To be determined in the 2028 election.

See also

 United States congressional delegations from New Hampshire
 List of United States representatives from New Hampshire
 Elections in New Hampshire

References

 
United States Senators
New Hampshire